Heartlight may refer to:

Heartlight (album), a 1982 album by Neil Diamond
"Heartlight" (song), the title song
"Heartlight (Polygon)", a 2013 song by Ts7
Heartlight (video game), a 1990 puzzle game for the Atari 8-bit family
Heartlight (novel), a 1990 novel by T. A. Barron